UCI Road World Championships – Men's junior road race is the annual world championship race for road bicycle racing for men in the Junior category. It is organised by the world governing body, the Union Cycliste Internationale. In the period 2005–2009 this event was part of the UCI Juniors World Championships, then the UCI Juniors Road World Championships in 2010. In 2020 no junior race was held due to the COVID-19 pandemic.

The winner of the event is entitled to wear the rainbow jersey in Junior competitions for one year.

Palmares

Medallists by nation

References

Men's road race
Junior men's road race
 
Lists of UCI Road World Championships medalists